The 2021–22 Oral Roberts Golden Eagles men's basketball team represented Oral Roberts University in the 2021–22 NCAA Division I men's basketball season. The Golden Eagles, led by fifth-year head coach Paul Mills, played their home games at the Mabee Center in Tulsa, Oklahoma, as members of the Summit League.

Previous season
In a season limited due to the ongoing COVID-19 pandemic, the Golden Eagles finished the 2020–21 season 18–11, 10–5 in Summit League play to finish in fourth place. In the Summit League tournament, they defeated North Dakotas and top-seeded South Dakota State to advance to the championship game. There they defeated North Dakota State to win the tournament championship. As a result, they received the conference's automatic bid to the NCAA tournament as the No. 15 seed in the South region, the school's first appearance since 2008. In the First Round, they upset No. 2-seeded Ohio State in overtime, becoming the first No. 15 seed since 2016, and just the ninth overall, to win a first-round game. In the Second Round, they defeated Florida, becoming just the second No. 15 seed to advance to the Sweet 16, the other being Florida Gulf Coast in 2013. In the Sweet 16, they matched up against Arkansas for their second meeting of the season, having played each other in the regular season, an Arkansas win. After a potential game-winning three missed at the buzzer, Arkansas came away with the win, preventing Oral Roberts from becoming the first-ever No. 15 to advance to the Elite Eight.

Roster

Schedule and results

|-
!colspan=12 style=| Non-conference regular season

|-
!colspan=12 style=| Summit League regular season

|-
!colspan=9 style=|Summit League tournament

Sources

References

Oral Roberts Golden Eagles men's basketball seasons
Oral Roberts Golden Eagles
Oral Roberts Golden Eagles men's basketball
Oral Roberts Golden Eagles men's basketball